The Oregon Channel was a former public affairs television network in the U.S. state of Oregon. It was operated by a consortium consisting of Oregon Public Broadcasting, Southern Oregon Public Television, the Oregon Legislative Assembly, the Oregon University System and the Oregon Public Affairs Network (OPAN). It was carried on most cable television systems throughout Oregon either on a part-time or full-time basis as well as on the Internet. The station operated 24 hours a day.

Programming 
When the State Legislature was in session live gavel-to-gavel coverage of the Oregon State Senate and the Oregon House of Representatives was carried until adjournment sine die.

When the legislature was not in session other live gavel-to-gavel programming was carried, including the Oregon Supreme Court, and meetings of the Governor and cabinet members. When no live gavel-to-gavel meetings were underway, other local or statewide public affairs programming was carried.

Demise 
Officials at the Oregon State Capitol planned to discontinue the broadcast of the Oregon Channel after the 2011 session, concluding that the channel's viewership had dropped too low to justify costs. Both the lack of interest from local Salem/Portland-area Public, educational, and government access (PEG) cable television channels and the failure of broadcasters to produce a reasonable agreement for transmission to other Government-access television (GATV) channels across Oregon ended the service.

Video of all legislative hearings and floor sessions continues to be streamed live on the legislature's website.

See also
 Phil Keisling

References

External links
Oregon State Legislature - Legislative Audio

Television stations in Oregon
Commercial-free television networks
Oregon Legislative Assembly
Legislature broadcasters in the United States
University and college mass media in Oregon
Television channels and stations established in 2007
2007 establishments in Oregon
Television channels and stations disestablished in 2011
2011 disestablishments in Oregon
Defunct television networks in the United States

Defunct mass media in Oregon